Maoritomella leptopleura is a species of sea snail, a marine gastropod mollusk in the family Borsoniidae.

Description
The height of the shell attains 5.7 mm, its width 2.5 mm.

Distribution
This marine species occurs on the continental slope of Eastern Transkei, South Africa

References

 R.N. Kilburn, Turridae (Mollusca: Gastropoda) of southern Africa and Mozambique. Part 3. Subfamily Borsoniinae; Annals of the Natal Museum, 1986 - reference.sabinet.co.za

External links
 
  Bouchet P., Kantor Yu.I., Sysoev A. & Puillandre N. (2011) A new operational classification of the Conoidea. Journal of Molluscan Studies 77: 273–308
 Biolib.cz: Maoritomella leptopleura R.N. Kilburn, 1986

Endemic fauna of South Africa
leptopleura
Gastropods described in 1986